Tonda is a Czech masculine given name that is a diminutive form of Antonín used in the Czech Republic. Notable people with this name include the following:

Given name
Tonda L. Hughes, American nursing academic

Surname
Joseph Tonda (born 1952), French, Congolese and Gabonese sociologist and anthropologist 
Patrice Tonda, Gabonese politician and diplomat.

See also

Toda (surname)
Tona (name)
Tonga (name)
Tonja (name)
Tonka (name)
Tonia (name)
Tonra, a surname
Tonya (given name)

Notes

Czech masculine given names